KTYL-FM (93.1 MHz) is a Townsquare Media radio station, licensed to Tyler, Texas, serving the Tyler-Longview-Jacksonville area, with a Top 40 (CHR) format. KTYL operates with an ERP of 82 kW from a transmitter site near Overton in western Rusk County. Studios are located on Brookside Drive in south Tyler in a building shared with Townsquare's other Tyler stations.

History

KSLT – Tyler's first FM station 
The initial construction permit for 93.1 was issued by the FCC on February 1, 1961, to Oil Center Broadcasting Company, owned by L.S. Torrans and Bryan L. Scott of Tyler. Construction of the station was completed by June of that year. Scott noted that the music broadcast by the station would include "everything that has withstood the test of time", which did not include rock and roll. The station was on the air by June 29. It originally operated with 5 kW of power from between the hours 10 a.m. to 10 p.m. daily.

KTYL featured an adult contemporary (AC) format from the 1980s until 1999.  In 1999, KTYL switched from AC Lite 93.1 to rhythmic oldies as Jammin' 93.1.  This format lasted until November 2001, when KTYL started playing Christmas music. At midnight December 26, 2001, KTYL switched to contemporary hit Top 40 music as Mix 93.1.  The first song on Mix 93.1 was "Jump" by Van Halen.  The "Mix" name was previously carried by sister Top 40 (CHR), KISX as Mix 107.3.  KISX re-launched as Kiss 107FM prior to the launch of the Mix 93.1.

References

External links

TYL-FM
Contemporary hit radio stations in the United States
1983 establishments in Texas
Radio stations established in 1983
Townsquare Media radio stations